A white stag (or white hind for the female) is a white-colored red deer, wapiti, sika deer, chital, fallow deer, roe deer, white-tailed deer, black-tailed deer, reindeer, moose, or rusa, explained by a condition known as leucism that causes its hair and skin to lose its natural colour. The white deer has played a prominent role in many cultures' mythology.

Biology
Leucism is a rare genetic pattern that causes a reduction in the pigment of an animal's hair and skin. The natural colour of the red deer ranges from dark red to brown. They are often thought to be albinos; however, unlike albinos, who have characteristically red eyes, deer with leucism have normal colouring in their eyes. It is distinguished biologically from albinism in that it causes a reduced pigmentation in all skin types, and not just melanin.

Symbolism

Folklore

White deer hold a place in the traditions of many cultures. They are considered to be messengers from the otherworld in some Celtic mythology; they also played an important role in other pre-Indo-European cultures, especially in the north. The Celts believed that the white stag would appear when one was transgressing a taboo, such as when Pwyll trespassed into Arawn's hunting grounds. In English folklore, the white hart is associated with Herne the Hunter.

Arthurian legend states that the creature has a perennial ability to evade capture, and that the pursuit of the animal represents mankind's spiritual quest. It also signalled that the time was high for the knights of the kingdom to pursue a quest.

In Catholicism and Eastern Orthodox, the white stag was partly responsible for the conversion of the martyr Saint Eustace. Eustace saw a vision of Christ between the stag's antlers and was told that he would suffer for Christ. A similar legend is associated with Saint Hubert.

The White Hart was the badge of King Richard II of England, who probably derived it from the arms of his mother, Joan "The Fair Maid of Kent", heiress of Edmund of Woodstock. It may also have been a pun on his name, as in "Rich-hart". Richard's White Hart is recumbent and wears a gold crown as a collar, attached to a long gold chain, symbolising both the suffering of Christ and Richard's burden of kingship, both noble and enslaved. It associated Richard's rule with piety and asserted his divine authority. The emblem features prominently in a notable piece of late 14th-century religious art known as Wilton Diptych (National Gallery, London), which is thought to be the earliest authentic contemporary portrait of an English king; in the diptych paintings, Richard II is depicted wearing a gold and enamelled White Hart jewel, and even the angels surrounding the Virgin Mary all wear White Hart badges. On one of the reverse panels, there is a White Hart seated on a bed of rosemary, symbolising remembrance and sorrow.

The white stag has also been invoked in contemporary society for its symbolism. Robert Baden-Powell, founder of the Scouting movement, spoke to Scouts at the 1933 World Jamboree in Gödöllő, Hungary, about the white stag:

Today, the Hungarian branch of Scouts uses the white stag as a symbol. The white stag is also prevalent in Hungarian mythology; it was believed that a white stag led the brothers Hunor and Magor to Scythia, an action which preceded the formation of the Hun and Magyar people. The White Stag Leadership Development Program bases much of its spirit and traditions on the white stag of Hungarian mythology.

Reasons for symbolism
The colour white has long been associated with purity; and in Celtic culture, the colour also represented the otherworld. In modern society, people have acted to protect the white stag as a vestige of beauty, and the hunting of the white stag has often been met with anger, because of its rare and elusive nature.

For early man, the deer represented a valuable resource, providing nourishment, clothing and other accessories; and the deer may have played a role in totemic culture.

In works of fiction

In Guigemar, one of the twelve Lais of Marie de France (supposedly based upon tales of the Celtic Bretons), a white doe with antlers appears as an omen to the titular character.

In the Arthurian romance of Erec and Enide written Chrétien de Troyes, based on earlier myths, the story begins with Arthur and his knights riding out for a customary hunt of the white stag for the Easter feast. According to tradition, whoever succeeds in hunting the white stag will be able to bestow a kiss on any noblewoman at court.

The white stag of Hungarian mythology was the subject of a children's book of the same name. The White Stag by Kate Seredy won the prestigious Newbery Medal as the Outstanding American book for children in 1938. This story describes the leadership of Attila—known by history as Attila the Hun, the "Scourge of God"—in their pursuit of a mythical white stag that led them to a new country and home.

A white doe is featured in the fairy tale The White Doe by Madame d'Aulnoy. A princess is transformed into the titular white doe as per a fairy's curse.

William Wordsworth's The White Doe of Rylstone is partly based on a legend of a white doe making weekly pilgrimages to Bolton Abbey.

A white doe in James Thurber's whimsical fairy tale The White Deer is transformed into a young woman when trapped by hunters, but her only memories are of fields and trees so no one is sure if she was originally a deer or a princess.

The white stag played an important role in C.S. Lewis' The Lion, the Witch and the Wardrobe novel. The Pevensie children (now grown-up kings and queens) hunt the Stag, hoping to gain wishes for catching it. It is in their pursuit of the Stag that they stumble back through the wardrobe and into their own world, returned to childhood. At the beginning of the story, the character of the White Witch appears in a sleigh drawn by two white reindeer, but there is nothing in the story that suggests they are connected to the White Stag, which is referred to by name in its chapter.

The white stag makes an appearance in The Elder Scrolls V: Skyrim, in which a large white stag is hunted as part of the quest "Ill Met by Moonlight".

The Myth of the White Stag is the theme of the second episode in the second season of the Black Butler anime.

The White Stag makes an appearance in Harry Potter as a Patronus Charm used by Harry Potter's future self to guide Harry. Harry's father is also known to use the same Patronus. A Patronus in the form of a white doe is later used by Snape to guide Harry to the sword of Gryffindor.

The White Stag, known as Malorne, is a demigod of nature in the Warcraft series of PC games.

It appears before the moment that the hero meets the Dryad in the PC game Quest for Glory.

The White Stag is a rare animal that can be hunted in an event chain in the game Crusader Kings 2 and its sequel, Crusader Kings 3.

The White Stag is also used in the films Snow White and the Huntsman and The Hobbit film series.

Blanche Noir, an anthropomorphic white stag, is a character in the fantasy webcomic Skin Deep.

The Lord of the North is a white stag in Throne of Glass, that plays a crucial role in blessing the rulers of Terrasen. 

A white stag, known as Morozova's stag, is a mythical creature in Leigh Bardugo’s Shadow and Bone trilogy.

Ezra Pound wrote a poem called "The white Stag", where he refers to Fame as the white stag that everyone is chasing.

See also
White Hart

References

External links
 BBC News: 'Ghost-like' white stag spotted

Mythological deer
Stag, white